Theron Catlen Bennett (July 9, 1879 – April 6, 1937) was an American pianist, ragtime composer, and music publisher.

Born in Pierce City, Missouri, he graduated in 1902 from the school which is now New Mexico State University. He worked for the Victor Kramer Co., which published some of his early compositions.  He became a music publisher, and later owner of a chain of music stores.  At one time he ran the Dutch Mill Cafe, a famous meeting place for musicians and artists in Denver, Colorado.  In the early 1920s, he lived in the Los Angeles area, where he formed a jazz band made up of USC students. He died in Los Angeles.

Selected compositions
Pickaninny Capers (1903)
St. Louis Tickle (1904) [as "Barney & Seymore", usually attributed to Bennett]
Sweet Pickles (1907) [as George E. Florence]

See also
List of ragtime composers

References
Rags and Ragtime by David A. Jasen and Trebor Jay Tichenor.  Dover, 1978

External links

1879 births
1937 deaths
American pianists
Ragtime composers
People from Pierce City, Missouri
American male pianists